"Go All Night"  is a song by English electronic music production duo Gorgon City. It features the vocals from American singer Jennifer Hudson. It was released on 14 December 2014 as a single from their debut studio album Sirens. The song was written by Kye Gibbon, Matthew Robson-Scott and Kiesza, and produced by Gorgon City. It has peaked at number 14 on the UK Singles Chart.

Music video
A music video to accompany the release of "Go All Night" was first released onto YouTube on 6 November 2014 at a total length of three minutes and fifty-two seconds.

Idolator.com said: "Gorgon City and Jennifer Hudson’s sparkling collaboration on “Go All Night” is fit for underground house clubs, which is exactly the theme for the song's official video! Directed by Roboshobo, the visual takes place at a rave that is ripped straight from the late-’90s. There are dancers vogueing, ladies beating their face with makeup and the musicians performing the tune on stage. It looks like a damn good time!".

Track listing and formats

Charts

Weekly charts

Year-end charts

Certifications

Release history

See also
 List of number-one dance singles of 2015 (U.S.)

References

2014 singles
2014 songs
Virgin EMI Records singles
Gorgon City songs
Jennifer Hudson songs
Songs written by Kiesza
Songs written by Kye Gibbon
Songs written by Matt Robson-Scott